The 1971 Cork Senior Football Championship was the 83rd staging of the Cork Senior Football Championship since its establishment by the Cork County Board in 1887. The draw for the opening round fixtures took place at the Cork Convention on 31 January 1971. The championship ran from 18 April to 10 October 1971.

Muskerry entered the championship as the defending champions, however, they were beaten by Carbery in the quarter-finals.

The final was played on 10 October 1971 at the Athletic Grounds in Cork between Carbery and University College Cork in what was their second ever meeting in the final and the first in seven years. Carbery won the match by 3-11 to 2-08 to claim their second championship title overall and a first title in three years.

University College Cork's Brendan Lynch was the championship's top scorer with 2-17.

Results

First round

Second round

Quarter-finals

Semi-finals

Final

Championship statistics

Top scorers

Overall

References

Cork Senior Football Championship